Yekaterina Kotko (born 20 October 1965) is a retired Soviet rower who won a silver medal in the eights at the 1991 World Championships. Next year her team finished fourth in this event at the 1992 Summer Olympics.

References

1965 births
Living people
Olympic rowers of the Unified Team
Rowers at the 1992 Summer Olympics
Soviet female rowers
World Rowing Championships medalists for the Soviet Union